Marie Skłodowska-Curie Actions (MSCA) is a set of major research fellowships created by the European Union/European Commission to support research in the European Research Area (ERA). The Marie Skłodowska-Curie Actions are among Europe's most competitive and prestigious research and innovation fellowships.

Established in 1996 as Marie Curie Actions and known since 2014 as Marie Skłodowska-Curie Actions, they aim to foster the career development and further training of researchers at all career stages. The Marie Skłodowska-Curie Actions promote interdisciplinary research and international collaborations, supporting scientists from not only within Europe but also across the globe.

Marie Skłodowska-Curie Actions are currently financed through the eighth Framework Programme for Research and Technological Development (called Horizon 2020) and belong to the so-called 'first pillar' of Horizon2020: "Excellent Science." Through this funding scheme, the Research Executive Agency (REA) has devoted over €6 billion to the Marie Skłodowska-Curie Actions between 2014 and 2020.

Since the launch of the programme in 1996, over 100,000 researchers had received MSCA grants by March 2017. To mark this milestone, the European Commission selected thirty highly-promising researchers (who achieved the highest evaluation scores in 2016) to showcase the EU's actions dedicated to excellence and worldwide mobility in research.

The eponymous Marie Skłodowska-Curie was a Polish-French physicist and chemist, and the first female Nobel prize winner. The only person to win a Nobel Prize for contributions in two different sciences (physics and chemistry), she was also the first person — and only woman — to have been awarded a Nobel Prize twice.

Types of funding 

Fellowships are awarded by the European Commission across scientific disciplines within the framework of Horizon 2020.

MSCA are grouped into the following schemes:
 Research Networks (ITN),
 Individual Fellowships (IF),
 Research and Innovation Staff Exchanges (RISE),
 Co-funding of regional, national and international programs involving mobility (COFUND),
 European Researchers' Night (NIGHT).

Within the framework of Horizon 2020, which runs from 2014 through 2020, MSCA will award €6.16 billion in funding.

See also 
 Horizon 2020
 Seventh Framework Programme

References

Sources

External links 
 Main Marie Curie Actions website
 Marie Curie Alumni Association

Fellowships
Science and technology in Europe